The Rauenstein is a table hill in Saxon Switzerland in Germany. It rises west of the Elbe inside the Elbe loop near Rathen. It thus rises almost  over the surrounding area. The Rauenstein is almost completely wooded, but has several dominant sandstone rock faces. The sandstone here is very soft and heavily weathered.

Location and area 
On the eastern side is the village of Weißig in the borough of Struppen. On the north and east side there are various climbing towers, the best known being the  Nonne or Nonnenstein, that is situated 200 metres from the eastern side of the Rauenstein. The rock was the site of a medieval watchtower (Burgwarte).

At the southeastern end of the Rauenstein is a hill restaurant that has been there since 1893. Before that, from 1886 to 1893, drinks were sold in the Kapp Cave (Kapphöhle), also the Kappmeyer or Kamm Cave, on the summit plateau. One year earlier the touristic development of the Rauenstein had been started by the Dresden Branch of the Mountain Club.

Views 
From the viewing point at the hill restaurant there is a panoramic view of Lilienstein and the village of Weißig.

Gallery

External links

Mountains of Saxon Switzerland
Rock formations of Saxon Switzerland
Rathen
Hills of Saxony